Queen Gonghye (Korean: 공혜왕후, Hanja: 恭惠王后; 8 November 1456 – 30 April 1474), of the Cheongju Han clan (Korean: 청주 한씨, Hanja: 淸州 韓氏), was the first wife of King Seongjong, 9th monarch of Joseon. She was the Queen of Joseon from 1469 until her death in 1474.

Life 
Han Song-yi was born November 8, 1456 into the Cheongju Han clan, as the youngest child of Han Myeong-hoe and his wife, Lady Min of the Yeoheung Min clan. Through her mother, Lady Han Song-yi was a first cousin once removed of Queen Jeongsun. Through her father, Lady Han is a first cousin four times removed of Queen Ansun, the second wife of King Yejong.

In 1460, her third older sister, Han Naeng-yi, who was 15 years old, married Yi Hwang, Crown Prince Haeyang and became the Crown Princess of Joseon.Her mother become “Internal Princess Consort Hwangryeo of the Yeoheung Min clan” (황려부부인 여흥 민씨, 黃驪府夫人 驪興 閔氏), and her father was granted the title of “Internal Prince Sangdang” (상당부원군, 上黨府院君). However, she died in 1461, due to postpartum illness, five days after giving birth to Yi Bun, Grand Prince Inseong. Posthumously, she was honoured as Queen Jangsun.

On January 12, 1467, when Han Song-yi was 10 years old, she married Yi Hyeol, Prince Jalsan, the youngest son of Crown Prince Uigyeong. She was granted the title of “Princess Consort Cheonan” (천안군부인), and her parents kept the same royal titles.

It was said that Jalsan's grandfather, King Sejo, intended to have Lady Han as a concubine for Jalsan, but Crown Princess Consort Han, the biological mother of the Prince, had sought to make Song-yi her daughter-in-law after seeing her through a window of Heo Gye-ji’s house (허계지, 許繼智). 

In 1469, with her father’s influence, Jalsan became King Seongjong, the 9th ruler of the Joseon Dynasty and Lady Han's status changed from Princess Consort to Queen. Her mother-in-law, now honoured as Queen Insu, was strict with her, but she taught the young Queen thoroughly in accordance with Confucian ethics such as having her read The Story of Yeolnyeo (열녀전). 

When the Queen couldn’t get pregnant, King Seongjong had started to take concubines. Without despising the women, Song-yi prepared and presented the clothes to them. She also gave jewelry and pieces of clothing as gifts to the concubines. 

In 1473, she moved to her hometown, the home of her parents, because of an illness and Seongjong made sure to visit her in order to check on her condition. The Queen recovered and moved back into the palace, but within the last months of the same year, her illness reappeared. Because her health didn’t improve, Song-yi requested to move her residence to Changdeok Palace, and the three Queen Dowagers (Jaseong, Insu and Inhye), as well the King, tended to her. Her parents were also granted permission to enter the palace and take care of their youngest daughter, but the Queen’s sickness didn’t seem to go away. 

Lady Han's parents did not eat as she was in bad health, but she urged them to eat as they have been starving for days while staying by her side. 

She died a couple of days later in Changdeok Palace’s Guhyeon Hall, at the age of 17 on April 30, 1474. 

For her posthumous title, Seongjong used “Gong” (공,恭) to praise her for docilely serving her in-laws, and “Hye” (혜, 惠) for her generosity, tenderness, and kindness. Her title became Queen Gonghye (공혜왕후, 恭惠王后).

Her Neungho was called Sunhon (순혼, 順魂), and later became Sunneung. The Jeonho was set as Sogyeongjeon.

In the 4th year of Yeonsangun's reign (1498), she was honoured with Hwiuishinsuk (휘의신숙, 徽懿愼肅) to her posthumous title. 

The Queen's memorial tablet is enshrined in Jongmyo's main hall and her tomb is located in Samneung, Bongilcheon-ri, Jori-eup, Paju-si, Gyeonggi Province.

Family
Parents

 Father − Han Myeong-hoe (26 November 1415 – 28 November 1487) (한명회, 韓明澮)
 Uncle − Han Myeong-jin (한명진, 韓明溍) (1426–1454). Wife: Lady Kwon of the Goryeong Kwon clan (고령 권씨, 安東 權氏)
 a) Grandfather − Han Gi (1393–1429) (한기, 韓起)
 b) Great-grandfather − Han Sang-jil (한상질, 韓尙質) (1350–1400)
 c) Great-great-grandfather − Han Soo (한수, 韓脩) (1333–1384)
 c) Great-great-grandmother − Lady Kwon of the Andong Kwon clan (안동 권씨, 安東 權氏)
 b) Great-grandmother − Lady Song of the Cheongpung Song clan (청풍 송씨, 昌化夫人 淸風 宋氏); Han Sang-jil’s 2nd wife
 a) Grandmother − Lady Yi of the Yeoju Yi clan (증 정경부인 여주 이씨, 贈 貞敬夫人 驪州李氏)

 Mother − Internal Princess Consort Hwangryeo of the Yeoheung Min clan (?–1479) (황려부부인 여흥 민씨, 黃驪府夫人 驪興 閔氏)
 a) Grandfather − Min Dae-saeng (1372–1467) (민대생, 閔大生)
 a) Grandmother − Lady Heo of the Yangcheon Heo clan (양천 허씨, 陽川 許氏)

Sibling(s)

 Older sister − Lady Han of the Cheongju Han clan. Husband: Shin Ju (신주, 申澍) of the Goryeong Shin clan (고령 신씨, 高靈 申氏)
 Nephew − Shin Jong-ho (신종호, 申從濩) (1456–1497)
 Grandnephew − Shin Hang (신항, 申沆) (1477–1507). Wife: Princess Hyesuk (혜숙옹주, 惠淑翁主) (1478–?); King Seongjong’s eldest daughter
 Older sister − Lady Han of the Cheongju Han clan. Husband: Yun Ban (윤반, 尹磻) of the Papyeong Yun clan (파평 윤씨, 坡平 尹氏)
 Older sister − Han Naeng-yi (한냉이), Queen Jangsun of the Cheongju Han clan (장순왕후 한씨, 章順王后 韓氏) (22 February 1445 – 5 January 1462). Husband: King Yejong (예종, 睿宗) (14 January 1450 – 31 January 1469)
 Nephew − Yi Bun, Grand Prince Inseong (인성대군 이분, 仁城大君 李糞) (31 December 1461 – 4 December 1463)

 Older brother: Han Bo (한보, 韓堡) (1447–1522). Wife: Lady Yi of the Hansan Yi clan
 Nephew − Han Gyeong-gi (한경기, 韓景琦) (1472–1529). Wives: (a) Lady Yi of the Jeonju Yi clan (전주 이씨, 淑人 全州 李氏) (b) Lady Kim of the Eonyang Kim clan (언양 김씨, 淑人 彦陽 金氏))
 Nephew − Han Gyeong-chim (한경침, 韓景琛) (1482–?). Wife: Princess Gongshin (공신옹주, 恭愼翁主) (1481–1549); King Seongjong’s third daughter

Consort

 Husband − Yi Hyeol, King Seongjong (20 August 1457 – 20 January 1494) (조선 성종) — No issue.
 Father-in-law − Yi Jang, King Deokjong (조선 덕종) (3 October 1438 – 20 September 1457)
 Legal father-in-law − Yi Hwang, King Yejong (조선 예종) (13 February 1450 – 31 December 1469)
 Mother-in-law − Queen Sohye of the Cheongju Han clan (소혜왕후 한씨) (7 October 1437 – 11 May 1504)
 Legal mother-in-law − Queen Jangsun of the Cheongju Han clan (장순왕후 한씨) (22 February 1445 – 5 January 1461)

In popular culture
 Portrayed by Kim Eun-hye in the 1994 KBS2 TV series Han Myung-hoe.
 Portrayed by Shin Ji-soo in the 1998-2000 KBS1 TV series The King and the Queen.
 Portrayed by Han Da-min and Kim Hee-jung in the 2007-2008 SBS TV series The King and I.

References

External link
 

15th-century Korean people
1456 births
1474 deaths
Royal consorts of the Joseon dynasty
Korean queens consort
Cheongju Han clan
15th-century Korean women